AFL Women's (AFLW) is Australia's national semi-professional Australian rules football league for female players. The first season of the league in February and March 2017 had eight teams; the league expanded to 10 teams in the 2019 season, 14 teams in 2020 and 18 teams in 2022. The league is run by the Australian Football League (AFL) and is contested by each of the clubs from that competition.

The AFLW is the most attended women's football competition in Australia and one of the most popular women's football competitions in the world. Its average attendance in 2019 of 6,262 a game made it the second-highest of any domestic women's football competition. Its record attendance of 53,034 for the 2019 AFL Women's Grand Final was formerly the highest of any women's sport in Australia and remains the highest of any women's football in Australia.

The AFLW has attracted an audience of more than 1 million attendees and 2 million viewers and has managed to maintain high interest despite moving to primarily ticketed and subscription broadcasting models. In addition to the most attended, it consistently ranks in the top three (alongside cricket and netball) most watched women's sporting competitions in Australia.

History

Establishment
In 2010, the AFL commissioned in report into the state of women's football around the country. Along with findings concerning grassroots and junior football, the report recommended the AFL Commission begin working toward the establishment of a national women's league. While the option of new stand-alone clubs was considered, a model using the resources and branding of existing AFL clubs was to be the preferred model for the planned league.

The historic match had a crowd of 7,518 and was won by Melbourne by 35 points.

On 15 May 2013, the first women's draft was held, establishing the playing lists for the two clubs in the forthcoming exhibition match. The match played on 29 June 2013 marked the first time two women's sides had competed under the banners of AFL clubs. The exhibition series was repeated with one game between the clubs in 2014 and two in 2015, the last of which, played on 16 August 2015, was the first women's AFL game to be broadcast on free-to-air television. It attracted an average audience of 175,000, which outweighed the 114,000 average audience for the AFL men's clash between Adelaide and Essendon of the previous day.

The success of these exhibition matches prompted the AFL to accelerate its plans for a nationwide women's competition, announcing a preferred start date of 2017. Prior to this, the league had announced only aspirational plans to have the women's competition established by 2020. The already-planned 2016 exhibition series was expanded at this time, with a total of ten matches to be played in venues across the country and featuring a range of new temporary representative teams.

In 2016, the AFL opened a process for existing clubs to tender applications to join the new competition. The 18 clubs in the men's AFL had until 29 April 2016 to place a bid for a licence, with 13 clubs making bids: Adelaide, Brisbane, Carlton, Collingwood, Fremantle, Geelong, Greater Western Sydney, Melbourne, North Melbourne, Richmond, St Kilda, West Coast, and Western Bulldogs. The AFL's preferred distribution of clubs was four clubs from Victoria and one each from New South Wales, Queensland, South Australia, and Western Australia.

The inaugural teams were announced on 8 June 2016. Both Western Australian clubs made bids, with 's bid chosen ahead of 's. All five unsuccessful bidders were granted provisional licences.

Details about the branding of the league were released in the second half of 2016. The AFL announced that the league would be named "AFL Women's" or AFLW for short, on 15 September 2016, with the logo being unveiled on 19 September 2016. The logo is a stylised rendition of an Australian rules football ground goal square and goal posts, drawn from a perspective that shows a "W". On 10 October 2016, the National Australia Bank was named as the league's naming rights sponsor.

The first premiership game was played on Friday, 3 February 2017 at Ikon Park. The AFL had initially planned to host the game at Melbourne's Olympic Park Oval, with a capacity of just 7,000, but was forced to change the venue to Ikon Park due to overwhelming interest and a lack of adequate seating. The match was deemed a "lockout" with a capacity crowd of 24,568 in attendance, with a few thousand estimated to have been waiting outside. As a result, Gillon McLachlan, the AFL's CEO, personally apologised to those who missed out. The game was also a great success on TV, attracting a national audience of 896,000, including 593,000 metropolitan free-to-air viewers, 180,000 regional free-to-air viewers, and 123,000 on Fox Footy. The Melbourne metropolitan audience of 424,000 was on par with that of Friday-night AFL men's matches.

The inaugural season concluded with the Grand Final held on Saturday, 25 March 2017. The  Crows were crowned the league's first premiers after defeating minor premiers, the Brisbane Lions. The scoreline read Adelaide 4.11 (35) def. Brisbane 4.5 (29).

Expansion (2019–present)
Expansion of the competition occurred in two installments, with two clubs added in 2019 and four in 2020, to result in 14 teams in total. The 10 AFL clubs not originally participating in the competition were invited to bid for inclusion, with priority given to the five clubs that unsuccessfully bid to participate in the inaugural season. The deadline to lodge submissions was 16 June 2017. A final decision on which clubs are admitted to the competition was expected by the end of July 2017, but was delayed several times to September 2017.

On 27 September 2017, the AFL announced that  and North Melbourne had been selected to enter the competition in 2019. North Melbourne retained its commitment to playing matches in Tasmania. The growth in clubs was accompanied by the introduction of American-style conferences for the 2019 season, further details of which can be found in the season structure section of this article. The conferences were abandoned in favour of the traditional single ladder ahead of the 2021 season. The 2020 season was curtailed and eventually cancelled without a premiership awarded due to the COVID-19 pandemic.

On 12 August 2021, the other four clubs without an AFLW license, Port Adelaide, and Sydney, were granted entry into the competition to commence in AFL Women's season seven.

Clubs

The competition's 18 teams are based across five states of Australia. Ten are based in Victoria (nine in the Melbourne metropolitan area), and New South Wales, Queensland, South Australia and Western Australia have two teams each. Australian Capital Territory, Northern Territory, and Tasmania are the only states or territories not to have AFLW teams, but North Melbourne has a formalised partnership with Tasmania, which enables the club to draft players from and play home games there.

Notes

Venues
Below are the venues that will host games during AFL Women's season seven.

Players

The club's playing lists were constructed from scratch through the later stages of 2016. All participants in the 2017 season were required to be over the age of 17.

Initially, clubs were asked to nominate a list of desired players, with the AFL assigning two of these "marquee" players to each club. In addition, clubs were able to sign a number of players with existing connections to the club, or with arrangements for club-sponsored work or study. This number varied for each club, in an attempt to equitably spread talent across the teams.  In addition, clubs were required to recruit two "rookies" – people with no Australian rules football experience in the previous three-year period.
The majority of players were later recruited through the 2016 AFL Women's draft. The remaining list spots were filled with free-agent signings in the week following the draft. In total, clubs have 27 active listed players in addition to injury replacements signed to take the spot of long-term injury-affected players.

Salary
The current collective bargaining agreement, in place until the end of the 2022 season, has total player payments per club of $576,240 in 2020 and $717,122 in 2022. 

Players are split into four tiers as follows:

Rules

The rules are mostly the same as those used in the AFL, with a few exceptions: 
The use of a slightly smaller ball, in line with other women's competitions. 
 Quarters last 15 minutes instead of 20, with time-on only in the last two minutes. 
 Teams have 16 players on the field at a time instead of 18, and have five interchange players and unlimited player rotations instead of four interchange players with one subtitute and 90 total rotations.
 Throw-ins are executed 10 metres in from the boundary line, instead of on the boundary line.
 A "last touch" out-of-bounds rule applies, except within the 50-metre arcs: during 2018, this "last touch" rule applied everywhere.

Season structure

Pre-season
Prior to the commencement of the home-and-away season teams are paired off to play an exhibition trial match. In 2017, these matches took place during varying weeks of January.

Premiership season and finals
For the first two seasons of competition, the home-and-away season was operated on a single table, and seven matches were played by each of the eight teams. The two highest-placed teams at the conclusion of the home-and-away season qualified for the Grand Final match, in the absence of a longer finals series.

With the addition of two extra teams in 2019, the AFL Women's home-and-away season introduced conferences, a concept not common in Australian sports. The top-two teams from the respective conferences qualified to the preliminary finals, with the first-ranked team in Conference A meeting the second-ranked team in Conference B and the opposite employed for the other preliminary final. The winners of those matches then met in the Grand Final.

The use of conferences was retained in 2020, along with the inclusion of four additional teams. The 14 teams were split into two conferences of seven, with teams playing each other team in their conference once. The top-four teams in each conference qualified for the finals series. The first round of the finals consisted of four knockout finals, with teams from opposite conferences playing against each other, first in Conference A versus fourth in Conference B, and so on. This left a final four of North Melbourne, Fremantle, Carlton, and Melbourne, with two rounds of finals to be played. At this point, the season was abandoned due to the COVID-19 pandemic, with no 2020 premier.

In 2021, the league reverted to a single 14-team ladder. Each team played 9 matches, with the top six qualifying for a three-week finals series. All finals are knockouts, with the top-two teams having a bye in the first round of the finals. Since 2022 the competition has been contested by 18 teams, and the finals series has expanded to eight teams and is played under the AFL final eight system that has been in use in the men's competition since the 2000 season.

Awards
These major individual awards and accolades are presented each season:

Best and Fairest Trophy – to the fairest and best player in the league, voted by the umpires
Leading Goalkicker Award – to the player who kicks the most goals during the home-and-away season
All-Australian Team – a squad of 21 players deemed the best in their positions, voted by an AFL-appointed committee
Rising Star Award – to the fairest and best young player under the age of 21 as at the start of the calendar year, voted by the AFL-appointed All-Australian committee
Grand Final Best on Ground Award – the best player on the ground in the Grand Final, voted by a committee of media members

Media coverage

Television
In its inaugural 2017 season, all matches were televised live by affiliate partners the Seven Network and Fox Footy. As part of the initial broadcast deal, the free-to-air carrier Seven broadcast one Saturday-night game per week as standard, in addition to the league's opening match and Grand Final. Pay TV network Fox Footy televised all premiership season matches, including simulcasts of the Seven-hosted matches other than the Grand Final. The two television networks covered the costs of broadcasting these matches, with no licensing fee payable to the league in exchange. “Fearless: The Inside Story Of The AFLW” debuted on Disney+ in 2022, the docu-series followed several AFLW clubs through the course of the 2022 season.

Online
The official internet/mobile broadcast partner of the AFL is BigPond, part of Telstra. The company hosts the league website and those of each of the eight participation clubs. The AFL has retained digital broadcast rights to matches in the league's inaugural season and will stream all matches live and free on the league website and mobile app. Since 2021 Kayo Sports has streamed all AFLW matches live and on demand in Australia.

Outside Australia, the inaugural season is available on Watch AFL.

Corporate relations

Sponsorships
The National Australia Bank is the league's inaugural and (as of 2022) current naming-rights partner.
All playing and training equipment, as well as all licensed apparel and hats for the league's clubs, are manufactured by Cotton On. Other 2017 league sponsors included Wolf Blass, Chemist Warehouse, and Kellogg's. The official ball supplier is Sherrin.

Merchandising
Official match-day attire, together with other club merchandise, is sold through the AFL's stores and website, as well through the clubs and some retailers.

Women's exhibition games (2013–2016) 
In 2016, the series was expanded to multiple teams from around the country.

Premiers and awards

Premiers

AFLW Best and fairest 
The best and fairest award determined in the same way as the Brownlow Medal for men, with umpires awarding three, two, and one votes to the best three players in each game, and suspended players are ineligible.

AFL Players' Association Most Valuable Player 
The MVP award is voted on by the players' peers, in a similar method to the Leigh Matthews Trophy for men.

AFL Coaches' Association Champion Player 
Each week, the senior coach of each club gives five votes to the player they consider to be best on ground in the game in which their team plays, four to the second-best, and so on to one for the fifth-best.

Leading goalkicker

See also

List of women's Australian rules football leagues

References

External links

 
First Friday in February – AFLW audio collection This collection consists of the full audio documentary on the first AFLW Women's game, along with 35 complete audio interviews, and related transcripts.

 
Australian Football League
 
2017 establishments in Australia
Sports leagues established in 2017
Professional sports leagues in Australia